Andre Gunder Frank (February 24, 1929 – April 25, 2005) was a German-American sociologist and economic historian who promoted dependency theory after 1970 and world-systems theory after 1984. He employed some Marxian concepts on political economy, but rejected Marx's stages of history, and economic history generally.

Biography
Frank was born in Germany to, pacifist writer Leonhard Frank and his second wife Elena Maqenne Penswehr, but his family fled the country when the Nazis came to power. Frank received schooling in several places in Switzerland, where his family settled, until they emigrated to the United States in 1941. Frank's undergraduate studies were at Swarthmore College, founded as a Quaker college from which he gained an Economics degree in 1950. He earned his PhD in economics in 1957 at the University of Chicago. His doctorate was a study of Soviet agriculture entitled Growth and Productivity in Ukrainian Agriculture from 1928 to 1955. Ironically, his dissertation supervisor was Milton Friedman, a man whose laissez faire approach to economics Frank would later harshly criticize.

Throughout the 1950s and early 1960s Frank taught at American universities. In 1962 he moved to Latin America, inaugurating a remarkable period of travel that confirmed his peripatetic tendencies. His most notable work during this time was his stint as Professor of Sociology and Economics at the University of Chile, where he was involved in reforms under the socialist government of Salvador Allende. After Allende's government was toppled by a coup d'état in 1973, Frank fled to Europe, where he occupied a series of university positions. From 1981 until his retirement in 1994 he was professor in developmental economy at the University of Amsterdam.

He was married to Marta Fuentes, with whom he wrote several studies about social movements, and with Marta he had two sons. Marta died in Amsterdam in June 1993. His second wife was sociologist Nancy Howell, a friend for forty years: while married to her, they lived in Toronto. Frank died in 2005 of complications related to his cancer while under the care of his third wife, Alison Candela.

Works and ideas
During his career, Frank taught and did research in departments of anthropology, economics, geography, history, international relations, political science, and sociology. He worked at nine universities in North America, three in Latin America, and five in Europe. He gave countless lectures and seminars at dozens of universities and other institutions all around the world in English, French, Spanish, Portuguese, Italian, German and Dutch. Frank wrote widely on the economic, social and political history and contemporary development of the world system, the industrially developed countries, and especially of the Third World and Latin America. He produced over 1,000 publications in 30 languages. His last major article, "East and West", appeared in the volume: "Dar al Islam. The Mediterranean, the World System and the Wider Europe: The "Cultural Enlargement" of the EU and Europe's Identity" edited by Peter Herrmann (University College Cork) and Arno Tausch (Innsbruck University), published by Nova Science Publishers, New York.

His work in the 1990s focused on world history. He returned to his analysis of global political economy in the new millennium inspired by a lecture he gave at the Stockholm School of Economics in Riga (SSE Riga). In 2006 SSE Riga received Andre Gunder Frank's personal library collection and set-up the Andre Gunder Frank Memorial Library in his honor, with the support of the Friedrich Ebert Foundation.

Frank was a prolific author, writing 40 books. He published widely on political economy, economic history, international relations, historical sociology, and world history. Perhaps his most notable work is Capitalism and Underdevelopment in Latin America. Published in 1967, it was one of the formative texts in dependency theory. In his later career he produced works such as ReOrient: Global Economy in the Asian Age and, with Barry Gills, The World System: Five Hundred Years or Five Thousand. Frank's theories center on the idea that a nation's economic strength, largely determined by historical circumstances—especially geography—dictates its global power. He is also well known for suggesting that purely export oriented solutions to development create imbalances detrimental to poor countries. Frank has made significant contributions to the world-systems theory (which, according to him, should be rather called the World System one). He has argued that a World System was formed no later than in the 4th millennium BC; his argument contrasts sharply with the scholarly majority who posit beginnings in the "long 16th century" (a position held, for example, by Immanuel Wallerstein). Frank also insisted that the idea of numerous "world-systems" did not make much sense (indeed, if there are many "world-systems" in the world, then they simply do not deserve to be called "world-systems"), and we should rather speak about one single World System.

In one of his last essays, Frank made arguments about the looming global economic crisis of 2008.

Selected publications

Books
 (1966) The Development of Underdevelopment. Monthly Review Press.
 (1967) Capitalism and Underdevelopment in Latin America. Monthly Review Press.
 (1969) Latin America: Underdevelopment or Revolution. Monthly Review Press.
 (1971) Lumpenburguesía : Lumpendesarrollo. México : Era.  (Spanish)
 (1972) Lumpenbourgeoisie, Lumpendevelopment. Monthly Review Press. (tr. Marion Davis Berdecio) 
 (1975) On Capitalist Underdevelopment. Bombay: Oxford University Press.
 (1976) Economic Genocide in Chile. Equilibrium on the point of a bayonet. Nottingham, UK: Spokesman.
 (1978) World Accumulation, 1492–1789. Monthly Review Press.
 (1978) Dependent Accumulation and Underdevelopment. Monthly Review Press.
 (1979) Mexican Agriculture 1521-1630: Transformation of the Mode of Production. Cambridge University Press.
 (1980) Crisis: In the World Economy. New York: Holmes & Meier.
 (1981) Crisis: In the Third World. New York: Holmes & Meier.
 (1981) Reflections on the World Economic Crisis. Monthly Review Press.
 (1982) Dynamics of Global Crisis, with S. Amin, G. Arrighi and I. Wallerstein. Monthly Review Press.
 (1983) The European Challenge. Nottingham, UK: Spokesman.
 (1984) Critique and Anti-Critique. New York: Praeger.
 (1996) The World System: Five Hundred Years or Five Thousand? with Barry K. Gills, Routledge.
 (1998) ReOrient: Global Economy in the Asian Age. Berkeley: University of California Press.
 (2013) ReOrienting the 19th Century: Global Economy in the Continuing Asian Age, with Robert A. Denemark, Paradigm Publishers.

Journal articles
 (1958) "General Productivity in Soviet Agriculture and Industry," Journal of Political Economy
 (1958) "Goal Ambiguity and Conflicting Standards: An approach to the study of organization," Human Organization
 (1977) "Long Live Transideological Enterprise: the socialist economies in the capitalist international division of labor," Review: A Journal of the Fernand Braudel Center
 (1989) "Ten Theses on Social Movements," with M. Fuentes, World Development
 (1990) "Theoretical Introduction to Five Thousand Years of World System History," Review: A Journal of the Fernand Braudel Center
 (1992) "Third World War: A Political Economy of the Gulf War and New World Order," Third World Quarterly 13(2).
 (1994) "Is Real World Socialism Possible?," Democracy & Nature, Vol.2, No.3, pp. 152–175

Book chapters
 (1990) "Civil Democracy, Social Movements in World History," with M. Fuentes. In Amin et al., Transforming the Revolution.
 (1990) "Revolution in Eastern Europe: Lessons for democratic socialist movements (and socialists)." In Tabb, ed., Future of Socialism.
 (1992) "The Underdevelopment of Development," with M.F. Frank. In Savoie, D.J. and I. Brecher, eds., Equity and Efficiency in Economic Development. Montreal: McGill-Queen's University Press.
 (2001) "The Global Economy, AD 1400-1800: Comparisons and Relations." In Suneja, V., ed., Understanding Business: Markets. A Multidimensional Approach to the Market Economy. London: Routledge.

See also
 History of globalization
 James Morris Blaut
 Samir Amin
 John M. Hobson
 World-systems theory

References

Notes

Further reading

 Chew, Sing C. & Robert Denemark, eds. 1996. The Underdevelopment of Development: Essays in Honor of Andre Gunder Frank. Thousand Oaks, CA: Sage.
 Duchesne, Ricardo, "Between Sinocentrism and Eurocentrism: Debating A.G. Frank's Re-Orient," Science & Society, Vol. 65, No. 4, 2001/2002, pp. 428–463
 Wallerstein, Immanuel, "Remembering Andre Gunder Frank," History Workshop Journal, Volume 61, Number 1, 2006, pp. 305–306(2), Oxford University Press
 Gills, Barry, "In Memoriam: Andre Gunder Frank (24 February 1929 to 23 April 2005)," Globalizations, Volume 2, Number 1, May 2005, pp. 1–4(4), Routledge
 Alberto Castrillón M, "In memoriam. André Gunder Frank (1929-2005)," Revista de Economía Institucional, Vol. 7 (2005) 273-278
 Gregory Shank, "In Memoriam: Remembering Andre Gunder Frank (February 24, 1929, to April 23, 2005)," Social Justice, Vol. 32, No. 2 (2005). Retrieved 30.12.2017.

External links
 Andre Gunder Frank website
 David Landes; Andre Gunder Frank; Economic History Debate on C-SPAN2 (Northeastern University World History Center, 1998-12-02)
 Theotonio dos Santos, André Gunder Frank (1929-2005) , Monthly Review, May 2005.
 Andre Gunder Frank, The Times, May 25, 2005
 Andre Gunder Frank (1929-2005)
 Andre Gunder Frank : 'Prophet in the Wilderness' (1929 -2005)
 Jeff Sommers, "The Contradictions of a Contrarian: Andre Gunder Frank", Social Justice, Vol.32, No.2 (2005).
 Andre Gunder Frank Audio Collection at the International Institute of Social History

1929 births
2005 deaths
Academics of the University of East Anglia
Deaths from cancer in Luxembourg
Dependency theorists
Economic historians
German economists
German male writers
German sociologists
Imperialism studies
Marxian economists
Marxist theorists
Marxist writers
Latin Americanists
Swarthmore College alumni
Academic staff of the University of Amsterdam
University of Chicago alumni
Academic staff of the University of Chile
World historians
World system scholars
Writers about globalization